Archery at the 1960 Summer Paralympics consisted of eight archery events, four for men and four for women.

Medal table

Participating nations

Medal summary

References 

 

 
1960 Summer Paralympics events
1960
Paralympics